Discodermia dissoluta is a deep-water sea sponge found in the Eastern, Southern, and Southwestern Caribbean, and in the Greater Antilles.

D. dissoluta is of interest to bio and organic chemists because it produces (+)-discodermolide, a polyketide natural product with immunosuppressive and cancer killing properties.

References 

Tetractinellida
Sponges described in 1880